Perlaza is a surname. Notable people with the name include:

Baldomero Perlaza (born 1992), Colombian professional footballer
Carlos Perlaza (born 1983), Colombian footballer
Flavio Perlaza (born 1952), Ecuadorian footballer
Jhon Perlaza (born 1994), Colombian sprinter
Jonathan Perlaza (born 1997), Ecuadorian footballer
Jorge Perlaza (born 1985), Colombian footballer
José Luis Perlaza (born 1981), Ecuadoran former footballer
Pedro Perlaza (born 1991), Ecuadorian footballer
Santiago Martinez Perlaza (born 1998), Colombian footballer

See also
Parleza (disambiguation)
Surnames of Colombian origin
Surnames of Ecuadorian origin
Spanish-language surnames